Robert "Robin" Leigh-Pemberton, Baron Kingsdown,  (5 January 1927 – 24 November 2013) was a British Peer and banker, who served as Governor of the Bank of England from 1983 to 1993.

Education and career

Leigh-Pemberton was educated at St Peter's Court, then at Eton College. He attended Trinity College, Oxford, graduating in 1950. In 1954, he was called to the Bar, and he practised law for several years before returning to Kent to manage the family estate of Torry Hill. He served as a Justice of the Peace and as Leader of Kent County Council. He eventually became chairman of the National Westminster Bank, then Governor of the Bank of England from 1983 until 1993.

Honours
He was appointed to the Privy Council in 1987, and created a life peer on 14 July 1993, as Baron Kingsdown, of Pemberton in the County of Lancashire. He became a Knight of the Order of the Garter in 1994, and was also the Lord Lieutenant of Kent. Between 1979 and 1992, he served as Honorary Colonel of the Kent and Sharpshooters Yeomanry and between 1977 and 1984 he served as Pro Chancellor of the University of Kent. He also served on the board of directors of the Bank of International Settlements

Personal life

His family has a long association with Kingsdown and Torry Hill, near Doddington, Kent, where he rebuilt the family mansion in the 1960s. It features a striking view north towards the Isle of Sheppey, the Swale and the Thames estuary. On the grounds of the estate, there is also what is believed to be the only Eton Fives court attached to a private dwelling; it was built in 1925. Lord Kingsdown's father also built a private miniature railway in the 1930s. This still runs for several miles on his estate.

One of his sons, James Leigh-Pemberton, continues the family's association with the Duchy of Cornwall (beginning with its Chancellor, the 1st Baron Kingsdown) as Receiver-General. His brother, Jeremy Leigh-Pemberton is a Deputy Lieutenant of Kent and is the parish chairman for the neighbouring parish of Wormshill.

His younger brother is the opera singer Nigel Douglas.

Arms

See also
Kingsdown and Torry Hill

References

1927 births
2013 deaths
Alumni of Trinity College, Oxford
Crossbench life peers
Fellows of Trinity College, Oxford
Governors of the Bank of England
Knights of the Garter
Knights of the Order of St John
Robin
Lord-Lieutenants of Kent
Members of the Privy Council of the United Kingdom
Leigh-Pemberton, Robin
People educated at Eton College
People educated at St Peter's Court
NatWest Group people
People from Kingsdown, Swale
20th-century English businesspeople
Life peers created by Elizabeth II